Sumangali is a 1959 Indian Tamil language drama film directed by M. K. R. Nambiar. The film stars K. Balaji and E. V. Saroja. It was released on 14 January 1959.

Plot

Cast 

Male cast
K. Balaji
C. S. Pandian
E. R. Sahadevan
Natarajan
K. Nagaiah
Pakkirisami

Male cast (Contd.)
Nambirajan
Babu
Stunt Krishnan
K. Kannan
 Karikol Raj
V. Namasivayam

Female cast
E. V. Saroja
T. K. Pushpavalli
Baby Kanchana
P. Mohana
Kamala
Mohana
P. Saraswathi

Production 
The film was produced by V. Thandavam under the banner Rajeswari Films. The story was based on a novel written by Vaduvur Duraisami Iyengar. Screenplay and dialogues were written by En Thangai fame Natarajan. Cinematography was handled by S. S. Nathan while editing was done by M. S. Parthasarathy. J. Gnanayudham was in charge of art direction. Choreography was handled by Natanam Nataraj, Sampath and Chinnilal. S. S. Radhakrishnan of Bharath Studio did the still photography. Stunt master was K. Kundumani. The film was shot at Vijaya, Narasu and Newtone studios. Processing was done at Vijaya Laboratories.

Soundtrack 
Music was composed by M. Ranga Rao while the lyrics were penned by En Thangai Natarajan.

References

External links 

1950s Tamil-language films
1959 drama films
Films scored by M. Ranga Rao
Indian drama films